The list of shipwrecks in July 1832 includes ships sunk, foundered, grounded, or otherwise lost during July 1832.

1 July

2 July

4 July

5 July

6 July

8 July

10 July

12 July

13 July

15 July

20 July

22 July

28 July

31 July

Unknown date

References

1832-07